The 2001–02 National Division One (previously known as the Allied Dunbar Premiership Two and renamed as the Jewson National Division One for sponsorship reasons) was the fourteenth full season of rugby union within the second tier of the English league system, currently known as the RFU Championship. New teams to the division included Bedford Blues who had been relegated from the Allied Dunbar Premiership 1999-00 while Otley and Birmingham & Solihull had been promoted from National League Two.  This season also saw the introduction of the bonus points scoring system. The season would also herald a new change in venue for Moseley who moved from their traditional home at The Reddings to share the University of Birmingham rugby pitch at Bournbrook, with The Reddings being sold to property developers in order to generate funds to keep the club in existence.

Leeds Tykes, the champions, were promoted to the Allied Dunbar Premiership for season 2001–02. There was only one promotion place available and the runners–up Worcester remained in National League 1 while Orrell and Waterloo were relegated to the 2001–02 National Division Two.

Participating teams

Table

Results

Round 1

Round 2

Round 3

Round 4

Round 5

Round 6

Round 7

Round 8

Round 9 

Postponed.  Game rescheduled to 18 April 2001.

Round 10

Round 11 

Postponed.  Game rescheduled to 3 March 2001.

Postponed.  Game rescheduled to 3 March 2001.

Postponed.  Game rescheduled to 17 February 2001.

Round 12

Round 13 

Postponed.  Game rescheduled to 17 February 2001.

Postponed.  Game rescheduled to 18 February 2001.

Postponed.  Game rescheduled to 18 February 2001.

Postponed.  Game rescheduled to 18 February 2001.

Postponed.  Game rescheduled to 17 February 2001.

Postponed.  Game rescheduled to 24 March 2001.

Postponed.  Game rescheduled to 3 March 2001.

Round 14

Round 15

Round 16 

Postponed.  Game rescheduled to 8 April 2001.

Postponed.  Game rescheduled to 7 April 2001.

Postponed.  Game rescheduled to 24 March 2001.

Postponed.  Game rescheduled to 24 March 2001.

Round 17

Round 18 

Postponed.  Game rescheduled to 8 April 2001.

Postponed.  Game rescheduled to 4 March 2001.

Round 19 

Postponed.  Game rescheduled to 25 April 2001.

Round 11 & 13 (rescheduled games) 

Game rescheduled from 30 December 2000.

Game rescheduled from 30 December 2000.

Game rescheduled from 9 December 2000.

Game rescheduled from 30 December 2000.

Game originally rescheduled from 30 December 2000 but postponed once again.  Game rescheduled to 24 March 2001.

Game rescheduled from 30 December 2000.

Round 20

Rounds 11, 13 & 18 (Rescheduled games) 

Game rescheduled from 9 December 2000.

Game rescheduled from 9 December 2000.

Game rescheduled from 30 December 2000.

Game rescheduled from 3 February 2001.

Round 21

Round 22 

Postponed.  Game rescheduled to 25 April 2001.

Postponed.  Game rescheduled to 24 March 2001.

Rounds 13, 16 (Rescheduled games) 

Game rescheduled from 18 February 2001 after having been originally rescheduled from 30 December 2000.

Game rescheduled from 20 January 2001.

Game rescheduled from 17 March 2001.

Game rescheduled from 20 January 2001.

Game rescheduled from 30 December 2000.

Round 23

Round 16 & 18 (Rescheduled games) 

Game rescheduled from 20 January 2001.

Game rescheduled from 20 January 2001.

Game rescheduled from 3 February 2001.

Round 24

Round 9 (Rescheduled game) 

Game rescheduled from 25 November 2000.

Round 25

Round 19 & 22 (Rescheduled games) 

Game rescheduled from 17 March 2001.

Game rescheduled from 10 February 2001.

Round 26

Total Season Attendances

Individual statistics 

 Note that points scorers includes tries as well as conversions, penalties and drop goals.

Top points scorers

Top try scorers

Season records

Team
Largest home win — 61 pts
81 - 20 Leeds Tykes at home to Orrell on 17 March 2001
Largest away win — 45 pts
48 - 3 Leeds Tykes away to Bedford Blues on 10 February 2001
Most points scored — 81 pts
81 - 20 Leeds Tykes at home to Orrell on 17 March 2001
Most tries in a match — 12
Leeds Tykes at home to Coventry on 4 March 2001
Most conversions in a match — 9
Leeds Tykes at home to Orrell on 17 March 2001
Most penalties in a match — 8
Orrell at home to Moseley on 16 September 2000
Most drop goals in a match — 2 (x4)
Bedford Blues at home to Henley Hawks on 9 September 2000
Exeter Chiefs at home to Wakefield on 16 September 2000
Otley away to London Welsh on 14 October 2000
Orrell at home to Wakefield on 3 February 2001

Player
Most points in a match — 31 (x2)
 Richard Le Bas for Leeds Tykes at home to Wakefield on 19 November 2000
 Sateki Tuipulotu for Worcester at home to Henley Hawks on 20 January 2001
Most tries in a match — 3 (x15)
N/A - multiple players
Most conversions in a match — 9
 Richard Le Bas for Leeds Tykes at home to Wakefield on 19 November 2000
Most penalties in a match —  8
 David Sleman for Orrell at home to Moseley on 16 September 2000
Most drop goals in a match —  2 (x4)
 James Shanahan for Bedford Blues at home to Henley Hawks on 9 September 2000
 Sam Howard for Exeter Chiefs at home to Wakefield on 16 September 2000
 Dan Clappison for Otley away to London Welsh on 14 October 2000
 David Sleman for Orrell at home to Wakefield on 3 February 2001

Attendances

Highest — 5,509 
Leeds Tykes at home to Worcester on 1 April 2001
Lowest — 200 (x3) 
Birmingham & Solihull at home to Waterloo on 14 October 2000, Moseley on 16 December 2001 & Otley on 4 February 2001
Highest Average Attendance — 2,231
Worcester
Lowest Average Attendance — 322
Birmingham & Solihull

See also
 English rugby union system

References

2000–01 in English rugby union leagues
2000-01